Han Jing (born November 30, 1973) is a retired professional wushu taolu athlete who represented Macau.

Career 
Han was originally a member of the Beijing Wushu Team and was transferred to Macau in 2000. Han's first medal she received in international competition was at the 2001 East Asian Games where she won the gold medal in the women's changquan combined event. A year later at the 2002 Asian Games, Han won the silver medal in women's changquan. She then competed at the 2003 World Wushu Championships in Macau and became the world champion in jianshu, thus winning the first gold medal for the Macau SAR after its return to China. Han also won a gold medal in duilian and at the 2005 World Wushu Championships, she won gold in the same event. Later that year, she competed in the 2005 East Asian Games where she won a gold medal in changquan and a silver medal in jianshu and qiangshu combined. A year later, Han was the flag-bearer for Macau at the 2006 Asian Games and won the bronze medal in women's changquan. 

At the 2007 World Wushu Championships, Han was a triple medalist, winning a silver medal in jianshu and two bronze medals in qiangshu and duilian. This qualified her for the 2008 Beijing Wushu Tournament, where she won the silver medal in the women's jianshu and qiangshu event. Han subsequently retired from competition.

Awards 
Awarded by the SAR of Macau:

 Honourific Title of Merit (2001)

See also 

 List of Asian Games medalists in wushu

References

External links 

 Athlete profile at the 2008 Beijing Wushu Tournament

Living people
1973 births
Competitors at the 2008 Beijing Wushu Tournament
Asian Games silver medalists for Macau
Asian Games bronze medalists for Macau
Asian Games medalists in wushu
Medalists at the 2002 Asian Games
Medalists at the 2006 Asian Games
Wushu practitioners at the 2002 Asian Games
Wushu practitioners at the 2006 Asian Games

Macau female wushu practitioners